Lejanie Palma Anigan (born 1 March 1978), known professionally as Cassandra "Cass" Ponti, is a Filipino former actress, dancer, model, and reality television contestant. After spending 112 days inside the house on Pinoy Big Brother, Ponti garnered 214,188 votes, 18.9% of total votes, to place third in the Big Night finale.

Ponti was an FHM model with the screen name Honey V. She's well known for her passion in cooking, Visayan accent, and her caring for others, especially inside the Pinoy Big Brother house. She was the cover model of the October 2006 issue of Maxim Philippines and the November 2008 issue of Playboy Philippines.

Ponti studied at Saint Mary's College in Tagum City, Davao del Norte and was an entertainer in Japan before she became model and actress.

Filmography

Movies
Banal (2007)
Agent X44 (2007)
Enteng Kabisote 3: Okay Ka, Fairy Ko: The Legend Goes On and On and On (2006)
Shake, Rattle and Roll VIII (2006)
Sabel (2004)

TV appearances
Rosalka as Jason's mother
Kung Tayo'y Magkakalayo as Vega
Maalaala Mo Kaya as Querida
Komiks - various roles
Babalik Kang Muli as Elyssa
ASAP
Boy & Kris
Wowowee
Abt Ur Luv
Pinoy Big Brother

References

External links
 Cassandra Ponti Official Website

Filipino people of Indian descent
1980 births
Pinoy Big Brother contestants
People from Tagum
People from Pasig
Star Magic
Filipina gravure idols
Filipino film actresses
Filipino television actresses
Living people